Oey Djie San, Kapitein der Chinezen (died in 1925) was a Chinese-Indonesian public figure, bureaucrat and landlord, best known for his role as Landheer of Karawatji and Kapitein der Chinezen of Tangerang. In the latter capacity, he headed the local Chinese civil administration in Tangerang as part of the Dutch colonial system of 'indirect rule'.

Life
Oey was born into an old family of the 'Cabang Atas' aristocracy in the Dutch East Indies (modern-day Indonesia). His father, Oey Khe Tay, also served as Kapitein der Chinezen of Tangerang from 1884 until dying in office in 1897, while his great-grandfather, Oey Eng Sioe, was a  der Chinezen from 1856 until 1864 before retiring with the honorary rank of Kapitein-titulair der Chinezen. Oey's mother, Nie Kim Nio, was the daughter of Nie Boen Tjeng, Kapitein der Chinezen and a descendant of Kapitein Nie Hoe Kong, who was in office at the time of the Chinese Massacre of Batavia in 1740. As a descendant of Chinese officers, Oey bore the title 'Sia' from birth. In addition to their tradition of public service, his family also owned extensive particuliere landerijen, or private domains, in Tangerang, centred on Karawatji.

In 1895, together with his father, Oey incorporated Cultuur-Maatschappij Karawatji-Tjilongok, a new landholding company with a capital of 600,000 guilders, controlling the family's historic domains of Karawatji-Tjilongok, Grendeng, Gandoe and Karawatji-Tjibodas. He acted as director of the newly-established company. As a Chinese-Indonesian country squire, he supported local education and cultural endeavours, for example by acting as patron of the local branch of Tiong Hoa Hwee Koan, a Confucian cultural and educational organisation, when it was founded in Tangerang in 1904. He also dabbled in horse racing, sending his thoroughbred, Rosebloom, to the races in 1907.

Oey's bureaucratic career began with his elevation in 1907 to the post of Kapitein der Chinezen of Tangerang in succession to the outgoing Kapitein Oey Giok Koen (in office from 1899 until 1907). The new incumbent was a maternal first cousin of the outgoing Kapitein's wife. This appointment broke with established convention, which dictated that a Kapitein should only be chosen from the ranks of Luitenants, usually the oldest or longest-serving. Though he came from a family of Chinese officers, Oey had not served previously in any government position. In 1909, he took a leave of absence for one year while he travelled on a 'Grand Tour' of Europe, in part to visit his two eldest sons who were at school in Haarlem in the Netherlands. He resumed his duties upon returning to the Indies in 1910, and served as Kapitein until 1916. In 1917, the former Kapitein was appointed by the colonial authorities to the Gewestelijke Raad ['Regional Council'] of Batavia.

Kapitein Oey Djie San died on October 11, 1925 in Karawatji, Tangerang. His eldest son, Oey Kiat Tjin, succeeded him as Landheer of Karawatji, and eventually in 1928 as the last Kapitein der Chinezen of Tangerang; a younger son, Oey Kiat Ho, was a prominent landowner and community leader.

See also
 Kapitan Cina
 Benteng Chinese
 Particuliere landerijen

References

1925 deaths
People of the Dutch East Indies
Indonesian people of Chinese descent
Indonesian Hokkien people
Kapitan Cina in Indonesia
Sia (title)